Budaklı can refer to:

 Budaklı, Gerger
 Budaklı, Göle
 Budaklı, Karaçoban